The 2023 World Mixed Doubles Curling Championship will be held from April 22 to 29 at the Gangneung Curling Centre in Gangneung, South Korea. The event will be held in conjunction with the 2023 World Senior Curling Championships.

Qualification
The following nations qualified to participate in the 2023 World Mixed Doubles Curling Championship:

Teams
The teams are listed as follows:

Round robin standings

Round robin results
All draw times are listed in Korean Standard Time (UTC+09:00).

Draw 1
Saturday, April 22, 10:00 am

Draw 2
Saturday, April 22, 2:00 pm

Draw 3
Saturday, April 22, 6:00 pm

Draw 4
Sunday, April 23, 10:00 am

Draw 5
Sunday, April 23, 2:00 pm

Draw 6
Sunday, April 23, 6:00 pm

Draw 7
Monday, April 24, 10:00 am

Draw 8
Monday, April 24, 2:00 pm

Draw 9
Monday, April 24, 6:00 pm

Draw 10
Tuesday, April 25, 10:00 am

Draw 11
Tuesday, April 25, 2:00 pm

Draw 12
Tuesday, April 25, 6:00 pm

Draw 13
Wednesday, April 26, 10:00 am

Draw 14
Wednesday, April 26, 2:00 pm

Draw 15
Wednesday, April 26, 6:00 pm

Draw 16
Thursday, April 27, 10:00 am

Draw 17
Thursday, April 27, 2:00 pm

Draw 18
Thursday, April 27, 6:00 pm

Relegation Playoff
Friday, April 28, 10:00 am

Playoffs

Qualification Games
Friday, April 28, 10:00 am

Semifinals
Friday, April 28, 6:00 pm

Bronze medal game
Saturday, April 29, 10:00 am

Final
Saturday, April 29, 2:00 pm

Final standings

References

External links

World Mixed Doubles Curling Championship
World Mixed Doubles Curling Championship
Sports competitions in Gangneung
International curling competitions hosted by South Korea
World Mixed Doubles Curling Championship
World Mixed Doubles Curling Championship